The Teat-fire cartridge was a .32 caliber pistol cartridge designed by Daniel Moore and manufactured by Moore and his partner David Williamson for their Pocket Revolver and was produced under both the Moore and National Arms marques by the National Arms Company of Brooklyn, New York in the mid-19th century.

The Moore Caliber .32 Teat-fire, which used a unique cartridge to get around the Rollin White patent owned by Horace Smith and Daniel Wesson, proved very popular during the Civil War, with both soldiers and civilians. The "Teat-fire" cartridges did not have a rim at the back like conventional cartridges, but were rounded at the rear, with a small "teat" that would protrude through a tiny opening in the rear of the cylinder. The priming mixture was contained in the "teat" and when the hammer struck it, the cartridge would fire. Thus, it was akin to a rimfire cartridge, but instead of having priming all the way around the edge of the rim, it is centrally located in the teat.  There were 2 variations of the "teat"; a round teat and a flat teat.  The flat version seems to be the one most commonly encountered by collectors.

Moore's Caliber .32 Teat-fire Pocket Revolver proved very popular during the American Civil War, with both soldiers and civilians. National Arms produced about 30,000 of the revolvers from 1864 to 1870, when it was acquired by Colt's Manufacturing Company.

References

External links

 
 

American Civil War weapons
Pistol and rifle cartridges